Palaeopleurodeles is an extinct genus of prehistoric amphibian.

See also
 Prehistoric amphibian
 List of prehistoric amphibians

References

Salamandridae
Miocene amphibians
Cenozoic salamanders
Fossil taxa described in 1941
Prehistoric amphibian genera